Cape Akarui, also known as Cape Miho, is a rocky cape  northeast of Cape Omega on the coast of Queen Maud Land. Mapped from surveys and air photos by the Japanese Antarctic Research Expedition, 1957–1962, and named Akarui-misaki ("bright cape").

References
 

Headlands of Queen Maud Land
Prince Olav Coast